Ian James Therkleson (born 11 October 1938) is a New Zealand cricketer. He played in 39 first-class and eight List A matches for Wellington from 1966 to 1974.

See also
 List of Wellington representative cricketers

References

External links
 
 List of first-class matches played

1938 births
Living people
New Zealand cricketers
Wellington cricketers
Cricketers from Wellington City